SBS Love FM (Hangul : SBS 러브FM also known as SBS Love FM) is a trot music, K-Pop music and News radio station of the Seoul Broadcasting System. The station is heard nationwide via syndication with only one local FM station in Korea via HLDG-SFM in Busan.

History 
 1990-11-14 : Seoul Broadcasting System Co. Ltd. was established.
 1991-03-20 : SBS AM launched.
 1993-07-01 : SBS enhanced its AM transmitting station.
 1993-07-18 : SBS AM started South Korea's first stereo AM Broadcast.
 1999-01-01 : SBS Love FM launched.
 2004 : Started South Korea's first internet radio broadcast via Gorealra PC application.
 2005 : Started South Korea's first internet visual radio (BORA) broadcast.
 2008-07-28 : Renamed as SBS Love FM.
 2015-06-30 : SBS Love FM Icheon relay station started broadcasting.
 2016-05-10 : SBS Regional Standard-FM Network's first establish: KNN.
 2017-05-10 : KNN Love FM Yangsan Gijang Jeonggwan relay station started broadcasting.
 2017-10-30 : KNN Love FM Changwon Gimhae Geoje relay station started broadcasting.
 2018-03-21 : KNN Love FM Jinju Gimhae Geoje relay station started broadcasting.

Stations

Seoul, Incheon, Gyeonggi Province

Other Provinces 
 Icheon via Icheon SBS on FM 98.3 MHz.
 Busan and Gyeongnam via HLDG-SFM on FM 105.7 MHz, FM 88.5 MHz, FM 89.5 MHz and FM 90.9 MHz, FM 98.7 MHz.

See also 
 KBS Radio 3
 SBS Power FM

References

External links 
 http://w3.sbs.co.kr/radio/main.do
 https://web.archive.org/web/20071023070757/http://global.sbs.co.kr/English/AboutSBSCo/channel.jsp
 http://radio.sbs.co.kr/charge/charge_lovefm.jsp

Love FM
Radio stations in South Korea
Radio stations established in 1999
1999 establishments in South Korea